Slovenj Gradec (after about 1900  Windischgraz) is a town in northern Slovenia. It is the centre of the City Municipality of Slovenj Gradec. It is part of the historical Styria region, and since 2005 it has belonged to the NUTS-3 Carinthia Statistical Region.

History
Gradec, Slovene for 'little castle', was first mentioned in a 1091 deed, then part of the Imperial March of Styria. The prefix Windisch (the traditional German name for Slavs in general and Slovenes in particular) was added to distinguish it from the city Graz (whose name has the same etymology). The modern Slovene name, Slovenj Gradec (literally: the Slovene Graz), derives from this German denomination. From 1180 until 1918, Slovenj Gradec belonged to the Duchy of Styria, since 1804 a crown land of the Austrian Empire. It was the ancestral seat of the Windisch-Graetz noble family first documented in 1220. Upon the dissolution of Austria-Hungary in 1918, with the rest of Lower Styria, it was included in the newly established Kingdom of the Serbs, Croats and Slovenes.

Until 1918, the town was a German-speaking island in a Slovene-speaking area. In the 1880 census, the town of Slovenj Gradec was 75 percent German-speaking and 25 percent Slovene-speaking. Many inhabitants, like the family of the composer Hugo Wolf, were of mixed ethnic origin. After the end of World War I, many of the local German-speaking inhabitants emigrated to Austria. Those who remained were gradually assimilated into the now Slovene-speaking majority. During World War Two, the town was occupied by the Nazis and annexed to the Third Reich. The local Slovenes were submitted to a policy of violent Germanization and many died of various persecutions. The partisan insurgency developed in the area, especially in the hills to the east of the town. After World War II, the remaining ethnic Germans were expelled from Yugoslavia, and Slovenj Gradec lost its traditional presence of German speakers.

From the 1950s onward, the town experienced a rapid industrialization and eventually became the unofficial economic and political center for Slovenian Carinthia. In 1994, it became one of the 11 towns in Slovenia with the status of City (or Urban) Municipality.

Main sights
The parish church in the town is dedicated to Saint Elizabeth of Hungary and belongs to the Roman Catholic Archdiocese of Maribor. It was first mentioned in written documents from 1235. Next to it stands a Gothic chapel dedicated to the Holy Spirit with frescos dating to the mid-15th century.

In 1994, an archaeological excavation uncovered the remains of what is believed to be the oldest church in Styria, dating to the Carolingian period (second half of the 9th century).

The Slovenj Gradec Art Gallery was founded in 1957 and is located on the first floor of the old town hall in the town centre. The gallery hosted international fine art exhibitions under the sponsorship of the United Nations in 1966, 1975, 1979, 1985, and 1991. The 1997 exhibition "The Artist and Urban Environment" displayed art activity in Peace Messenger Cities from all over the world. In 2012, Slovenj Gradec and Ptuj were partners with Maribor, the European Capital of Culture. As a result, the gallery presented further exhibitions that attracted Europe-wide attention.

Notable residents
Notable people that were born or lived in Slovenj Gradec include:
Roman Bezjak (born 1989), footballer
Katarina Čas (born 1976), actress
Sašo Fornezzi (born 1982), footballer
Ivan Gams (sl) (1923–2014), geographer
Janja Garnbret (born 1999), rock climber
Ana Gros (born 1991), handball player
David Kiselak  (born 1988), footballer
Lado Kralj (1938–2022), writer, theatre critic, and literary historian
Tina Maze (born 1983), skier, Olympic champion 
Boštjan Nachbar (born 1980), basketball player 
Vinko Ošlak (born 1947), author
Karel Pečko (1920–2016), artist
Iztok Puc (1966–2011), handball player
Renata Salecl (born 1962), philosopher
Adi Smolar (born 1959), singer-songwriter
Katarina Srebotnik (born 1981), tennis player
Ilka Štuhec (born 1990), alpine ski racer
Marko Šuler (born 1983), football player
Nikola Tolimir (born 1989), footballer
Tadej Trdina (born 1988), footballer 
Hugo Wolf (1860–1903), composer. The house in which he was born is now a museum.

International relations

Twin towns — Sister cities
Slovenj Gradec is twinned with:

Charter of cultural cooperation was signed with Bardejov, Slovakia.

International Association of Peace Messenger Cities 
Since 1989, Slovenj Gradec was one of the most active and progressive cities within The International Association of Peace Messenger Cities, being a member of its executive board since 1997 and secretary-general of this organization in periods 2007–2010, 2010–2013, 2013–2016, and 2016–2019.

References

External links

 Official website (Slovenian)
 Town Heraldry
 Slovenj Gradec at Geopedia
 Koroška galerija likovne umetnosti

 
Populated places in the City Municipality of Slovenj Gradec
Windisch-Graetz
Cities and towns in Styria (Slovenia)